Turrancilla is a genus of sea snails, marine gastropod mollusks in the family Ancillariidae.

Species
Species within the genus Turrancilla include:

 Turrancilla akontistes Kilburn, 1980
 Turrancilla apicalis (Ninomiya, 1988)
 Turrancilla glans (E. A. Smith, 1899)
 Turrancilla monachalis (Ninomiya, 1988)
 Turrancilla sibuetae (Kantor & Bouchet, 1999)
 Turrancilla williamsoni Petuch, 1987

References

External links
 Kantor Yu.I., Fedosov A.E., Puillandre N., Bonillo C. & Bouchet P. (2017). Returning to the roots: morphology, molecular phylogeny and classification of the Olivoidea (Gastropoda: Neogastropoda). Zoological Journal of the Linnean Society. 180(3): 493-541

Ancillariidae
Gastropod genera